Muuss is a surname. Notable people with the surname include:

Bobby Muuss (born 1976), American college soccer coach
Mike Muuss (1958–2000), American computer programmer
Rolf Muuss (1924–2020), German-American psychologist and academic

See also
Muus